Mascots is a 2016 mockumentary comedy film directed by Christopher Guest, who co-wrote the screenplay with Jim Piddock. The film features an ensemble cast consisting of Jane Lynch, Parker Posey, Fred Willard, Ed Begley Jr., Christopher Moynihan, Don Lake, Zach Woods, Chris O'Dowd, Michael Hitchcock, Bob Balaban, and Jennifer Coolidge.

Guest has a small role as Corky St. Clair, a character he first played in Waiting for Guffman.  Posey, Willard, Lake, Balaban, and Hitchcock also appeared in Guffman, but play different roles in this film.

Mascots premiered at the Toronto International Film Festival on September 10, 2016, before being released on Netflix on October 13, 2016.

Plot

Several sports mascots compete for the World Mascot Association championship's Gold Fluffy Award.

Cast

Production
Netflix announced on August 11, 2015 that it would be released on the streaming service in 2016. It was reported on August 26, 2015 that previous Guest collaborators Jane Lynch, Parker Posey, John Michael Higgins, Jennifer Coolidge, Bob Balaban, and Chris O'Dowd were in negotiations to join the film. It screened in the Special Presentations section at the 2016 Toronto International Film Festival.

Reception
On review aggregator Rotten Tomatoes, the film has an approval rating of 48% based on reviews from 48 critics, with an average rating of 5.70/10. On Metacritic, the film has a score of 57 out of 100 based on 16 critics, indicating "mixed or average reviews".

Devan Coggan of Entertainment Weekly wrote: "If you're a Guest devotee, you’ll be in the stands cheering; otherwise, Mascots feels like a bit of a retread."
Stephen Dalton of The Hollywood Reporter wrote: "The gentle tone and disjointed sketch-show structure here will appeal to long-standing fans, but Mascots wins no prizes for innovation or progression. The jokes are uneven, the caricatures often overly broad and the plot almost nonexistent."

References

External links
 

2016 films
2010s mockumentary films
American mockumentary films
Films with screenplays by Christopher Guest
English-language Netflix original films
Films directed by Christopher Guest
2016 comedy films
American crossover films
Comedy crossover films
2010s English-language films
2010s American films